This is a list of the main career statistics of professional Australian tennis player Samantha Stosur. She won nine WTA singles titles, including one Grand Slam title at the 2011 US Open, while reaching the finals of 16 other WTA tournaments, including one Grand Slam final at the 2010 French Open, the 2013 WTA Tournament of Champions final, and three Premier 5 finals. Stosur also reached another three French Open semifinals (2009, 2012, 2016), two US Open quarterfinals (2010, 2012), and qualified for the WTA Tour Championships three times in a row (2010–12), reaching the semifinals in both 2010 and 2011. She reached her highest singles ranking of No. 4 in the world in February 2011.

Stosur also enjoyed a successful doubles career, in which she held the world No. 1 ranking for 61 consecutive weeks between February 2006 and April 2007, finished as the year-end world No. 1 doubles team with former partner Lisa Raymond in 2005 and 2006, and was the year-end world No. 1 doubles player in 2006. Stosur won 28 WTA doubles titles, including four Grand Slam women's doubles titles at the 2005 US Open, 2006 French Open, 2019 Australian Open, and 2021 US Open, as well as two consecutive WTA Tour Championship titles in 2005 and 2006. She reached an additional five Grand Slam finals in doubles at the 2006 Australian Open, the 2008, 2009 and 2012 Wimbledon Championships, and the 2008 US Open.

Stosur achieved notable success in mixed doubles too, winning three Grand Slam titles at the 2005 Australian Open and the 2008 and 2014 Wimbledon Championships. She would close out her playing career by reaching two more Grand Slam finals at the 2021 Australian Open and the 2022 Wimbledon Championships, both with compatriot Matthew Ebden.

Performance timelines

Only main-draw results in WTA Tour, Grand Slam tournaments, Fed Cup/Billie Jean King Cup and Olympic Games are included in win–loss records.

Singles

Doubles
Current through the 2023 Australian Open.

Mixed doubles

Significant finals

Grand Slam tournaments

Singles: 2 (1 title, 1 runner-up)

Doubles: 9 (4 titles, 5 runner-ups)

Mixed doubles: 5 (3 titles, 2 runner-ups)

Year-end championships finals

Doubles: 2 (2 titles)

WTA 1000 finals

Singles: 3 (3 runner-ups)

Doubles: 15 (10 titles, 5 runner-ups)

WTA career finals

Singles: 25 (9 titles, 16 runner-ups)

Doubles: 43 (28 titles, 15 runner-ups)

ITF Circuit finals

Singles: 7 (4 titles, 3 runner–ups)

Doubles: 21 (11 titles, 10 runner–ups)

WTA Tour career earnings
Stosur earned more than 20 million dollars during her career.
{|cellpadding=3 cellspacing=0 border=1 style=border:#aaa;solid:1px;border-collapse:collapse;text-align:center;
|-style=background:#eee;font-weight:bold
|width="90"|Year
|width="100"|Grand Slam <br/ >titles|width="100"|WTA <br/ >titles
|width="100"|Total <br/ >titles
|width="120"|Earnings ($)
|width="100"|Money list rank
|-
|2003
|0
|0
|0
| align="right" |70,219
|140
|-
|2004
|0
|0
|0
| align="right" |155,183
|81
|-
|2005
|2
|6
|8
| align="right" |775,962
|16
|-
|2006
|1
|9
|10
| align="right" |982,257
| bgcolor="eee8aa" |9
|-
|2007
|0
|5
|5
| align="right" |572,712
|26
|-
|2008
|1
|0
|1
| align="right" |527,685
|31
|-
|2009
|0
|1
|1
| align="right" |1,179,681
|12
|-
|2010
|0
|1
|1
| align="right" |2,090,340
| bgcolor="eee8aa" |8
|-
|2011
|1
|1
|2
| align="right" |3,476,153
| bgcolor="eee8aa" |5
|-
|2012
|0
|0
|0
| align="right" |1,936,184
| bgcolor="eee8aa" |10
|-
|2013
|0
|3
|3
| align="right" |1,230,152
|17
|-
|2014
|1
|1
|2
| align="right" |1,055,960
|24
|-
|2015
|0
|2
|2
| align="right" |944,416
|32
|-
|2016
|0
|0
|0
| align="right" |1,352,051
|25
|-
|2017
|0
|1
|1
| align="right" |682,346
|46
|-
|2018
|0
|1
|1
| align="right" |701,050
|53
|-
|2019
|1
|0
|1
| align="right" |1,146,514
|37
|-
|2020
|0
|0
|0
| align="right" |106,745
|178
|-
|2021
|1
|1
|2
| align="right" |739,482
|45
|-
|2022
|0
|0
|0
| align="right" |274,438
|152
|- style="font-weight:bold"
|Career
|8
|32
|40
| align="right" |20,051,140
|22
|}

 Career Grand Slam statistics 

Grand Slam tournament seedings
The tournaments won by Stosur are in boldface, and advanced into finals by Stosur are in italics.

 Singles 

 Doubles 

 Mixed doubles 

 Best Grand Slam results details 
Grand Slam winners are in boldface', and runner–ups are in italics.

 Singles 

Head-to-head records

Record against top 10 playersStosur's record against players who have been ranked in the top 10. Active players are in boldface.''

No. 1 wins

Top 10 wins

Notes

References

External links
 
 
 

Stosur, Samantha